This list is of the Cultural Properties of Japan designated in the category of  for the Prefecture of Toyama.

National Cultural Properties
As of 1 January 2015, one Important Cultural Property has been designated, being of national significance.

Prefectural Cultural Properties
As of 1 January 2015, six properties have been designated at a prefectural level.

See also
 Cultural Properties of Japan
 List of National Treasures of Japan (historical materials)
 List of Historic Sites of Japan (Toyama)
 Etchū Province
 List of Cultural Properties of Japan - paintings (Toyama)

References

External links
  Cultural Properties in Toyama Prefecture
  Cultural Properties in Toyama Prefecture

Cultural Properties,historical materials
Historical materials,Toyama